Kongad may refer to:

Kongad is a town  and state assembly constituency in Palakkad district, state of Kerala, India. It is a local government organisation that serves the villages of Kongad-I and Kongad-II. 
 Kongad-I, a village in Palakkad district, Kerala, India
 Kongad-II, a village in Palakkad district, Kerala, India
 Kongad (gram panchayat), a gram panchayat that serves the above villages
 Kongad (State Assembly constituency)